Just Another Pandora's Box, also known as Once Upon a Chinese Classic, is a 2010 Hong Kong parody film directed by Jeffrey Lau, starring Ronald Cheng, Gigi Leung, Betty Sun, Eric Tsang, Huang Bo, Guo Degang, Gillian Chung, and Patrick Tam. It is a spiritual successor to Lau's two-part 1995 film A Chinese Odyssey. Athena Chu, who starred in A Chinese Odyssey, makes a guest appearance in Just Another Pandora's Box.

The film's Chinese title is a pun on the Chinese title of the first part of A Chinese Odyssey, Yuè Guāng Bǎo Hé (月光寶盒). The last three characters of each title are the same, only the first differs; the pronunciations of 月 and 越 are the same in both Cantonese (jyut6) and Mandarin (yuè). The older title translates literally to "Moonlight Treasure Box"; in the title of this film, the character for "moon" is replaced by 越, in this context meaning "more" or "surpassing".

In addition to A Chinese Odyssey, the film spoofs Red Cliff and also makes references to other films such as The Eagle Shooting Heroes, Kung Fu Hustle, House of Flying Daggers, CJ7, Kung Fu Panda, Titanic, King Kong, The Green Hornet, and The Matrix, as well as events such as the 2008 Summer Olympics.

Plot
Rose Fairy is sailing along the river when she suddenly trips on a rope and falls into the water. The trap is set by the bandit Qingyise, who wants to rob her. He steals the Purple Sword from her and plans to sell it. Just then, Joker (the protagonist in A Chinese Odyssey) appears and makes Qingyise unsheathe the sword by pulling away its scabbard. Rose Fairy regains consciousness and mistakenly thinks it was Qingyise who unsheathed the sword. Since she has made a promise to marry the person who unsheathes the sword, she follows Qingyise wherever he goes, leading to a cat-and-mouse chase between the two of them.

Qingyise and Rose Fairy run into Grandpa Buddha and his assistant, who are chasing Bull King for the Pandora's Box. By accident, Qingyise recites "Prajñāpāramitā" and activates the box, causing him to be transported back in time to the Eastern Han dynasty. He finds himself as Zhao Yun at the Battle of Changban, where he is supposed to save Liu Bei's infant son. While the rescue mission turns out to be successful, Qingyise unwittingly brings Liu Bei's son straight into the enemy camp, right before Cao Cao, who confiscates the Pandora's Box and sends him away. Unable to return to his own time, Qingyise is forced to cooperate with Rose Fairy, who has infiltrated Liu Bei's camp in disguise as an ambassador from Turkestan. The two of them make their escape in the midst of the Battle of Red Cliffs.

Cast
The opening sequence of the film states that Jackie Chan, Stephen Chow, Jet Li, Chow Yun-fat, Maggie Cheung, Zhang Ziyi and Angelina Jolie refused to be in this movie.

Main cast

Special appearances

Other cast

References

External links
 
 

2010 films
Hong Kong comedy films
Films directed by Jeffrey Lau
2010s parody films
2010 comedy films
2010s Cantonese-language films